La Perla is a historical shanty town astride the northern historic city wall of Old San Juan, Puerto Rico, stretching about 650 yards (600 m) along the rocky Atlantic coast immediately east of the Santa Maria Magdalena de Pazzis Cemetery and down the slope from (north of) Calle Norzagaray.

La Perla was established in the 18th century. Initially, the area was the site of a slaughterhouse because the law required the homes of former slaves and homeless non-white servants – as well as cemeteries – to be established away from the main community center; in this case, outside the city walls. Sometime after, some of the farmers and workers started living around the slaughterhouse and shortly established their houses there.

History, location and description

Located inside the Old San Juan Historic District,  (The Pearl) was originally the site of a slaughterhouse, called .  It was built in the 18th century outside the walls of San Juan by slaves who were required to live outside the city. Slaves built homes and lived near the slaughterhouse and later , (Puerto Rican farmers) who moved to San Juan, lived there.

La Perla belongs to and consists of the northernmost stretches of  Mercado subbarrio (west) and San Cristóbal subbarrio in San Juan Antiguo barrio. San Juan Antiguo barrio is located on Isleta de San Juan, an island off San Juan, the capital of Puerto Rico, and it is connected to the mainland by bridges and causeways. La Perla is in the Old San Juan Historic District which is managed by US National Park Service.

La Perla has sometimes been described as a slum and as a shantytown, because many homes have been built without proper permits. While tourists have normally been deterred from visiting La Perla, some entrepreneurs have tried to change its image with art galleries, cafés and restaurants. , a local community group has coordinated tours.

Only four access points exist into La Perla: one through the Santa María Magdalena de Pazzis Cemetery, and the others from Calle Norzagaray, named after Spanish soldier and colonial governor, Fernándo Norzagaray y Escudero.

Calle Tiburcio Reyes (western border, along the outside of the old city wall)
Calle San Miguel (mostly in the western part, along the north)
Calle Bajada Matadero (mostly in the western part, along the south)
Calle Lucila Silva (mostly in the western part, east-west through the middle, too narrow for cars)
Calle Augustín O Aponte (eastern part)

Despite the fact that many homes in La Perla have been built without proper permits, residents of La Perla do have utility services. Garbage pickup is done regularly in the neighborhood, which in 1973 consisted of about 900 houses and 3,300 residents.

La Perla has a community-oriented music recording studio, El Estudio D' Oro, which serves as a free of cost music production workshop for all ages.  El Estudio D' Oro is also home to the FM urban radio show, Hip Hop 787 La Verdadera Escuela, which is broadcast live from the studio on WVOZ Mix 107.7 FM.

In 2010, Carmelo Anthony remodeled the basketball court located to the eastern side of La Perla, with a new surface and design featuring the logo of Air Jordan’s Melo footwear line. It eventually became known by the name of the Nuyorican athlete, who also repaired several other venues throughout the island. The refurbished playing field was later included among "the most breathtaking locations for a basketball court in the world" due to its oceanside location overlooking the Atlantic.

In June 2011, the Drug Enforcement Agency with other agencies targeted 50 properties in La Perla and indicted 114 people from La Perla for drug trafficking. The area has a reputation for being dangerous, but the popular 2017  music video filmed there made it a curiosity amongst tourists, with some wanting to venture in to see where the video was filmed.

In 2016, students of architecture at universities in Puerto Rico asked children for their ideas on how to improve their favorite areas of La Perla.  is a colorful, bowl-shaped cemented area in La Perla, used for skateboarding on weekdays, and then filled with water on weekends, to serve as a pool.

On September 20, 2017, Hurricane Maria hit Puerto Rico and La Perla "looked like it was hit by a bomb". "Despacito" (the song title that translates to "slowly") was also used to highlight and criticize the slow United States response to the destruction at La Perla caused by Hurricanes Irma and Maria, where the video was filmed.  The National Park Service assisted the few residents of La Perla with tarps soon afterwards.

Census
In terms of the United States 2000 Census, La Perla is composed of Census blocks 3001 through 3010 (Block group 3, Census tract 4, San Juan, Puerto Rico). A population of 338 was reported, 198 housing units (29 unoccupied), and 169 households, on an area of 80,028 square yards (16.53 acres; 66,914 m²).

La Perla belongs to and consists of the northernmost stretches of the subbarrios Mercado (west) and San Cristóbal in San Juan Antiguo barrio. The dividing line between the subbarrios is the imagined extension of Calle San Justo to the north beyond the old city wall to the Atlantic coast. The eastern part consists of Census blocks 3002, 3009 und 3010, with a population of 64, 35 housing units (4 unoccupied), and 31 households, on  41,348 square yards (8.5 acres; 34,572 m²).

Media and popular culture

La Perla was the true site of the fictional "La Esmeralda" barrio depicted in Oscar Lewis's sociological work "La vida: a Puerto Rican family in the culture of poverty--San Juan and New York", describing the lives of Puerto Rican slumdwellers and prostitutes. From La Perla, through taped interviews with dozens of intertwined family members who lived there in the 1940s-1960s, Lewis wrote an award-winning and controversial book. Controversial because his award-winning book, written in 1967, would influence the way people viewed Puerto Rican women and Puerto Ricans, in general. "Many who read his book assumed the whores of La Perla were typical of all Puerto Rican women."

In 1978, salsa singer Ismael Rivera had a hit song, written by composer Catalino Curet Alonso, in honor of this community, and named after it. In 2009 Urban Music group Calle 13 released another tribute song, also  named La Perla, in collaboration with Ruben Blades. In the song, Blades references Rivera's early effort; in the song's video, Blades pays his respects to Curet by visiting his tomb at the community's Santa María Madgalena de Pazzis cemetery.

Canadian singer Nelly Furtado along with Calle 13 band member Residente filmed the music video to the remix of Furtado's song No Hay Igual  on 26 June 2006 in La Perla. Residente said he hoped that the video would help them both reach new audiences: "It's a good opportunity for us both. More than the North American market, the European market really interests me and her because her family is Portuguese." The video was directed by Israel Lugo and Gabriel Coss, photographed by Sonnel Velazquez and produced by María Estades.

In Giannina Braschi's political allegory United States of Banana (2011), the Puerto Rican prisoner Segismundo is born in the dungeon of the Statue of Liberty as the illegitimate child of a woman from La Perla and the Governor of Puerto Rico Luis Muñoz Marín.

The Puerto Rican classic play by La Carreta (1953) by René Marqués takes place in La Perla. A poor family moves from their farm to La Perla, and then to the Bronx for the better life that they never quite find.

The motion picture The Vessel (film) starring Martin Sheen about a tidal wave that destroys a small town was filmed in La Perla in 2013.

With more than 6 billion views on YouTube, La Perla became world-known with the music video for the song Despacito being filmed there.

Gallery

See also
 List of communities in Puerto Rico

References

Bibliography

External links
 

Old San Juan, Puerto Rico
Geography of San Juan, Puerto Rico
18th-century establishments in Puerto Rico
Populated places established in the 18th century